Carenum ineditum is a species of ground beetle in the subfamily Scaritinae, found in Australia. It was described by William John Macleay in 1869.

References

ineditum
Beetles described in 1869